Tomana is a surname. Notable people with the surname include:

 Johannes Tomana (born 1967), Zimbabwean attorney and Prosecutor-General
 Marek Tomana (born 1979), Slovak football midfielder